The Zambia women's national field hockey team is the national women's team representing Zambia in field hockey.

Tournament record

Africa Cup of Nations
1990 – 4th
2017 – Withdrew 
2022 - 7th

See also
Zambia men's national field hockey team

References

field hockey
African women's national field hockey teams
National team